Ed James (born Edward Charles Stirk 23 March 1976 in Knighton, Radnorshire) is a British disc jockey, broadcaster and journalist, who currently hosts Drive Time for Heart West Midlands in Birmingham alongside Gemma Hill. He moved to the Drive Time Show in 2019, after presenting the Breakfast Show since 2002 on Heart. He is also a columnist with the Birmingham Mail, Chairman of the Birmingham Press Club and is the co-founder of content marketing agency HDY Agency.

Career

He started on the radio aged twelve on BBC Radio York. While studying at Newcastle University, he presented at various radio stations across England before getting his first 'proper' job at a station in Manchester. James presented many shows before joining 100.7 Heart FM in Birmingham as Breakfast Show presenter in 2002 taking over from Daryl Denham. He worked alongside Hellon Wheels until 2006, and Sarah-Jane Mee from 2007 to 2008. Rachel New was his co-presenter from 2008 to 2016 after moving from neighbouring station Kerrang! 105.2. Since January 2017, his co-presenter has been Gemma Hill. In 2011 the Heart Breakfast Show won a Gold Sony Radio Award for Best Competition for its Beat The Star quiz that saw members of the public from around the Midlands competing alongside celebrities such as Gok Wan and Leona Lewis to answer general knowledge questions. On 17 April 2012 James celebrated ten years as the Heart Breakfast Show presenter with a champagne breakfast in the studio, while Rachel New presented him with a pet lamb as a gift.

James presented ITV Central's The Biz, a weekly round-up of the latest goings-on in the Midlands for Films, Music and Gigs. In 2009 he became a columnist for the Birmingham Mail, writing about entertainment and showbiz. In April 2012 he was named as Chairman of Birmingham Press Club, narrowly beating former Central Tonight presenter Llewella Bailey to secure the position. Birmingham Press Club is the oldest organisation of its kind in the world.

James's mother is TV chef Anne Stirk, who appeared on Gloria Hunniford's Channel 5 daily show Open House as the resident chef.

In June 2018, James co-founded content marketing agency HDY Agency with marketeer Angel Gaskell. James is a qualified NLP practitioner and a member of Create Central.

References

External links
 Profile at Heart
 edjames.com

1976 births
Living people
British radio DJs
British radio personalities
British television personalities
British male journalists
People from Radnorshire
Welsh radio DJs
Welsh radio personalities
Welsh television personalities
Welsh journalists
Heart (radio network)